Dezil' is a music band from Seychelles.

The group was formed in 2005. They received a diamond disc award after their debut single "San ou (La Rivière)" reached second position on the French music chart

Discography

Albums
 Welcome to the Paradise (2006)
 To ou tar (2017)

Singles
"San ou (La Rivière)" : #2 in France, 550,000 copies sold, #11 in Belgium (Wallonia), #19 in Switzerland
"Laisse tomber les filles (qui se maquillent)" [cover version of a 1980s hit, "Pass the Dutchie" by Musical Youth, a group composed of teenagers] : #13 in France, #47 in Switzerland
"Tu peux crier" : #17 in France

References

Seychellois musical groups
Musical groups established in 2003